The 2004 European Grand Prix (officially the 2004 Formula 1 Allianz Grand Prix of Europe) was a Formula One motor race held on 30 May 2004 at the Nürburgring. It was Race 7 of 18 in the 2004 FIA Formula One World Championship. The race was noticeable due to the race strategy employed by Ferrari. Michael Schumacher extended his gap over his rivals to close to 18 seconds in the first 7 laps, when the top-runners seemed to bunch up behind Kimi Räikkönen. After his pitstop, Schumacher exited in 6th place, moved back up when others made their pitstops and cruised to a dominant victory in front of his teammate Rubens Barrichello. Takuma Sato broke the overall lap record with a time of 1:27.691 in the first qualifying session, and also took his first front row start.

Schumacher and Barrichello left the champagne unsprayed after the death of former Fiat chairman Umberto Agnelli, who had died of lymphatic cancer aged 69 on 27 May.

Friday drivers
The bottom 6 teams in the 2003 Constructors' Championship were entitled to run a third car in free practice on Friday. These drivers drove on Friday but did not compete in qualifying or the race.

Classification

Qualifying

Race

Championship standings after the race 

Drivers' Championship standings

Constructors' Championship standings

Note: Only the top five positions are included for both sets of standings.

References 

European Grand Prix
European Grand Prix
European Grand Prix
May 2004 sports events in Europe